Kingdom of Shadows (2000) is a novel by Alan Furst. It won the 2001 Hammett Prize.

Plot summary

The story is set in Europe between April 1938 and July 1939, a time of ever-increasing fear and apprehension throughout the continent.  Nicholas Morath is an expatriate Hungarian in his forties and the co-owner of an advertising agency in Paris.  His uncle, Count Janos Polanyi, is a high-level functionary at the Hungarian embassy in France.  Morath is in fact an amateur spy, sent on one dangerous mission after another at his uncle's behest (laundering money through the Antwerp diamond industry, or spending a week in a Romanian jail, for example).  Polanyi tells his nephew little about the reasons for or the results of these excursions, and friction often rises between the two men.  But after Polanyi disappears mysteriously, Morath continues his perilous work alone.

Characters

Count Janos Polanyi is an elderly Hungarian aristocrat and a career diplomat.  He seems to be a cynical, urbane gentleman who appreciates all the pleasures Paris has to offer.  He is in fact guided by two secret convictions: a belief than men like himself did too little to prevent the First World War and a determination to prevent Hitler and his minions from taking over Hungary.

Nicholas Morath is a combat veteran of the First World War, has resided in Paris for almost twenty years, and appears to live the life of a successful business executive and man about town.  But like his uncle, he considers himself to be a member of "the Hungarian Race", an aristocracy committed to the old knightly ideals even in an age when castles and titles are a thing of the past.  His intimidating looks belie a warm, generous nature that few people can see.

Cara Dionello is Morath's lover in the first part of the book.  A shallow young Argentine heiress living in Paris on her father's money, she prefers not to notice Morath's frequent absences unless they interfere with her good time.  Cara provides comic relief and is clearly the latest of a series of similar women in Morath's life.

Mary Day is a copy editor at Morath's ad agency.  She is a thoughtful and perceptive women who is drawn to Morath's less obvious qualities, and the two grow very close in the later stages of the story.  She writes "naughty" novels under a pen name for Obelisk Press, and thus has a secret life of her own.

Colonel Sombor is a security officer at the Hungarian embassy and a member of Hungary's Fascist element.  He takes a malevolent interest in Polanyi, Morath, and their activities.  A final confrontation between him and Polanyi ends nastily.

Boris Balki is a Russian bartender with underworld connections, Herbert Mitten is a Romanian Jew and a struggling actor, and Wolfi Szubl is a travelling lingerie salesman of uncertain origin.  All are expatriates like Morath who assist him on his missions.

Themes

Travel

"Maybe the Belgian border guards didn't care who came and went, but the French customs inspectors did."
 
Furst (a seasoned travel writer) uses travel and its related experiences to vividly depict the Europe his characters live in.  Morath journeys across the continent by train frequently and sees a world of suspicious border guards, desperate passengers with the wrong papers, and tenuous luxury surrounded by encroaching violence and squalor.  A random brick thrown through a compartment window symbolizes the collapse of yet another country.  Paris, the adopted home Morath returns to time and again, is for him the endangered symbol of an older and more decent way of life.

Honor and Obligation

"'I'm just a fat old Hungarian man, Nicholas.  I can't save the world.  I'd like to, but I can't.'"

Like many veterans of World War I, Nicholas Morath believes that he squandered his youth in a meaningless and senseless conflict that knocked the world off its hinges.  He views the prospect of another war with numb horror.  But he and his uncle have a special cross of their own to bear, for they are among the scattered survivors of the old European upper class that failed to prevent the earlier war.  A new evil is now engulfing Europe, and an unspoken obligation to fight it hangs over both of them.

Love and Redemption

"'You are really very good, Nicholas,' she said. 'Really you are.'"

Love (as in many works of literature) is presented here as one of the highest human aspirations, something that can energize a spirit and set it free.  Morath lives for many years in a twilight world of secrets and danger, and seems to take solace in a series of easy women who ask no questions about the things that matter to him.  By forging a relationship with someone who demands to know what is truly important to him (Mary Day), he finds his soul mate even as their physical world crumbles around them.

Novels by Alan Furst
2000 American novels
American spy novels
Historical novels
Novels set during World War II
Fiction set in 1938
Fiction set in 1939
Random House books